This list of ammonites is a comprehensive listing of genera that are included in the subclass †Ammonoidea, excluding purely vernacular terms. The list includes genera that are commonly accepted as valid, as well those that may be invalid or doubtful (nomina dubia), or were not formally published (nomina nuda), as well as junior synonyms of more established names, and genera that are no longer considered ammonites. 


Reliability of this list
Most of the generic names in this list come from Jack Sepkoski's 2002 compendium of marine fossil genera, which can be corroborated by other sources such as Part L, Ammonoidea, in the
Treatise on Invertebrate Paleontology. Additional generic names included come from the Treatise or various peer review scientific journals.

A

Ab 
Abbasites
Abichites
Abrytasites

Ac 
Acanthaecites
Acanthinites
Acanthoceras
Acanthoceratites
Acanthoclymenia
Acanthodiscus
Acanthohoplites
Acantholytoceras 
Acanthopleuroceras
Acanthoplites
Acanthoscaphites
Accardia
Achilleoceras
Acompsoceras
Aconeceras
Acriclymenia
Acrimeroceras
Acrioceras
Acrocanites
Acrochordiceras
Acuariceras
Acuticostites
Acutimitoceras

Ad 
Adkinsia
Adkinsites
Adnethiceras
Adrianites

Ae 
Aegasteroceras
Aegoceras
Aegocrioceras
Aegolytoceras
Aenigmatoceras

Ag 
Agassiceras
Agastrioceras
Agathiceras
Agoniatites

Ai 
Ainoceras
Aioloceras

Ak 
Akmilleria
Aktubinskia
Aktubites
Aktuboclymenia

Al 
Alanites
Alaoceras
Albanites
Alcidellus
Aldanites
Alfeldites
Algericeras
Algerites
Alligaticeras
Alloceratites
Alloclionites
Allocrioceras
Alloptychites
Almites
Almohadites
Alocolytoceras
Alpinites
Alsatites
Altudoceras
Alurites

Am 
Amaltheus
Amarassites
Amauroceras
Ambites
Ammonellipsites
Ammonitoceras
Ammonoceratites
Amoebites
Amoeboceras
Amorina
Amphipoanoceras
Amphistephanites
Ampthillia

An
Anacleoniceras
Anadesmoceras
Anaflemingites
Anagaudryceras
Anagymnites
Anagymnotoceras
Anahamulina
Anahoplites
Anaklinoceras
Analytoceras
Ananorites
Anapachydiscus
Anarcestes
Anascaphites 
Anasibirites
Anasirenites
Anatibetites
Anatomites
Anatropites
Anatsabites
Anavirgatites
Anaxenaspis
Anclyoceras
Ancolioceras
Andersonites
Anderssonoceras
Andesites
Andiceras
Androgynoceras
Anetoceras
Aneuretoceras
Anfaceras
Anglesites
Angranoceras
Angulaticeras
Anisarcestes
Anisoceras
Ankinatsytes
Annuloceras
Anolcites
Anotoceras
Antarcticoceras
Anthracoceras
Anthracoceratites
Anthracoceratoides

Ap 
Aphantites
Apleuroceras
Aplococeras
Apoderoceras
Aposphinctoceras
Apsorroceras

Aq 
Aquilonites

Ar 
Araneites
Araxoceras
Arcanoceras
Arcestes
Archoceras
Arcthoplites
Arcticoceras

Ar (Cont.)
Arctocephalites
Arctoceras
Arctogymnites
Arctohungarites
Arctomeekoceras
Arctomercaticeras
Arctoprionites
Arctoptychites
Arctosirenites
Arctotirolites
Arestoceras
Argentiniceras
Argolites
Argonauticeras
Argosirenites
Arianites
Aricoceras
Arieticeras
Arietites
Arietoceltites
Arisphinctes
Aristoceras
Aristoceratoides
Aristoptychites
Arkanites
Armatites
Arnioceltites
Arnioceras
Arniotites
Arpadites
Arthaberites
Artinksia
Artioceras
Artioceratoides

As 
Asaphoceras
Asapholytoceras
Asklepioceras
Aspenites
Asphinctites
Aspidoceras
Aspidostephanus
Aspinoceras
Asteroceras 
Asthenoceras
Astiericeras
Astieridiscus
Astreptoceras
Asturoceras

At 
Ataxioceras
Atlantoceras
Atsabites

Au 
Audaxlytoceras
Audouliceras
Augurites
Aulacaganides
Aulacosphinctes
Aulacosphinctoides
Aulacostephanus
Aulasimoceras
Aulatornoceras
Austiniceras
Australiceras
Austroceratites
Austrotrachyceras

Av 
Aveyroniceras

Ax 
Axinolobus
Axonoceras

B

Bacchites
Bactrites
Baculina
Baculites
Badiotites
Bagnolites
Balatonites
Balearites
Balkanites
Balticeras
Balvia
Bamyaniceras
Barguesiella
Baronnites
Barrandeites
Barremites
Barroisiceras
Baschkirites
Bashkortoceras
Baskaniiceras
Basleoceras
Bastelia
Bauchioceras
Bayleites
Beaniceras
Beatites
Behemoth
Beleutoceras
Beloceras
Benacoceras
Beneckeia
Benueites
Berbericeras
Berniceras
Berriasella
Berrosiceras
Betyokites
Beudanticeras
Beudantiella
Bevahites
Beyrichites
Beyrichoceras
Beyrichoceratoides
Bhimaites
Bifericeras
Bigotites
Bihenduloceras
Bilinguites
Billcobbanoceras
Biloclymenia
Biltnerites
Binatisphinctes
Binneyites
Biplices
Bisatoceras
Blanfordiceras
Bochianites
Bodylevskites
Boehmoceras
Boesites
Bogdanoceras
Bollandites
Bollandoceras
Boreomeekoceras
Borissjakoceras
Borkinia
Bornhardticeras
Bosnites
Bostrychoceras
Boucaulticeras
Bouleiceras
Bradfordia
Brahmaites
Bramkampia
Brancoceras
Branneroceras
Branneroceratoides
Brasilia
Bredyia
Brevikites
Brewericeras
Brightia
Brodieia
Brotheotrachyceras — originally published as a subgenus of Trachyceras
Brouwerites
Buchiceras
Budaiceras
Buddhaites
Bukowskiites
Bullatimorphites
Bulogites
Bunburyiceras
Burckhardites
Burijites
Busnardoites

C

Ca
Cabrievoceras
Cadoceras
Cadomites
Cadomoceras
Caenisites
Caenocyclus
Caenolyroceras
Cainoceras
Calaiceras
Calanquites
Californiceras
Callihoplites
Calliphylloceras
Calliptychoceras
Callizoniceras
Caloceras
Calycoceras
Campylites
Canadoceras
Canavarella
Canavaria
Canavarites
Cancelloceras
Cantabricanites
Cantabrigites
Cardiella
Cardioceras
Carinoceras
Carinoclymenia
Carinophylloceras
Carnites
Carstenia
Carthaginites
Catacoeloceras
Catasigaloceras
Catulloceras
Caucasites
Caumontisphinctes
Cavilentia

Ce
Ceccaites
Celaeceras
Cenisella
Ceratites
Ceratpbeloceras
Chamoussetia

Ch
Chanasia
Changhsingoceras
Chartronia
Cheiloceras
Cheloniceras
Cheltonia
Chesapeakiceras
Chetaites
Chieseiceras
Chioceras
Chiotites
Choffatia
Choffaticeras
Chondroceras
Choristoceras
Christioceras
Christophoceras
Chumazites

Ci
Cibolaites
Cibolites
Cicatrites
Cirroceras

Cl
Cladiscites
Clambites
Cleistosphinctes
Cleoniceras
Cleviceras
Clinolobus
Clionitites
Clioscaphites
Clistoceras
Cloioceras
Cluthoceras
Clydomphalites
Clydoniceras
Clydonites
Clymenia
Clymenoceras
Clypeoceras

Co 
Coahuilites
Cobbanites
Cobbanoscaphites
Cochleiferoceras
Cochloceras
Cochlocrioceras
Coeloceltites
Coeloceras
Coeloderoceras
Coilopoceras
Colchidites
Collectoceras
Collignoniceras
Collignonites
Collina 
Collotia
Colombiceras
Coloradoscaphites
Columbites
Concavites
Conlinoceras
Constileioceras
Convoluticeras
Cordubiceras
Coroceras
Corongoceras
Coroniceras
Coronites
Costaclymenia
Costidiscus
Costigymnites

Costileioceras
Costimitoceras
Cottreauites
Couloniceras
Cowtoniceras

Cr
Cranocephalites
Craspedites
Craspedodiscus
Crassiceras
Crassiplanulites
Crassotornoceras
Cravenites
Cravenoceras
Cravenoceratoides
Creniceras
Crickites
Crimites
Crioceras
Crioceratites
Cruasiceras
Crucilobiceras
Crussoliceras
Cryptoclymenia
Cryptotexanites

Ct
Ctenobactrites
Cteroclymenia

Cu
Cubaochetoceras
Cuccoceras
Cuneicardioceras
Cunitoceras
Cunningtoniceras
Cutchisphinctes
Cuyaniceras

Cy
Cyclobactrites
Cycloceltites
Cyclolobus
Cycloclymenia
Cylioceras
Cymaceras
Cymaclymenia
Cymahoplites
Cymbites
Cymoceras
Cyrtobactrites
Cyrtochilus
Cyrtoclymenia
Cyrtopleurites
Cyrtosiceras

Cz
Czekanowskites

D

Da
Dactylioceras 
Dagnoceras
Daixites
Dalmasiceras
Dalmatites
Damaisiceras
Damesiceras
Damesites
Danubisphinctes
Danubites
Daphnites
Daraelites
Darellia
Darvasiceras
Dasyceras
Daxatina
Dayiceras

De
Decipia
Decorites
Deiradoceras
Delecticeras
Delepinoceras
Delphinites
Demarezites
Derolytoceras
Deshayesites
Desmoceras
Desmophyllites
Desmoscaphites
Devonobactrites
Devonopronorites

Dh
Dhosaites
Dhrumaites

Di
Diaboloceras
Diadochoceras
Diamanticeras
Diaplococeras
Diaziceras

Di (Cont.)
Dichotomites
Dichotomoceras
Dichotomosphinctes
Dickersonia
Dicostella
Didymites
Didymoceras
Dieneria
Difuntites
Digitophyllites
Dilatobactrites
Dimeroceras
Dimeroclymenia
Dimorphinites
Dimorphites
Dimorphoceras
Dimorphoceratoides
Dimorphoplites
Dimorphotoceras
Dinarites
Diodochoceras
Dionites
Diplacmoceras
Diplasioceras
Diplesioceras
Diplomoceras
Diplosirenites
Dipoloceras
Dipoloceroides
Dirrymoceras
Discoceratites
Discoclymenia
Discohoplites
Discophiceras
Discophyllites
Discoptychites
Discoscaphites
Discosphinctes
Discosphinctoides
Discotropites
Distichites
Distichoceras
Distoloceras

Di (cont. 2)
Dittmarites
Divisosphinctes

Dj
Djurjuriceras

Do
Dobrodgeiceras
Dobrogeites
Docidoceras
Dolikephalites
Domanikoceras
Dombarigloria
Dombarites
Dombarocanites
Donetzoceras
Dorikranites
Dorsetensia
Dorsoplanites
Doryceras
Doubichites
Doulingoceras
Douvilleiceras

Dr
Drepanites
Drumoceras

Du
Duashnoceras
Dufrenoya
Dumortieria
Dunbarites
Dunedinites
Dunveganoceras
Durangites
Durotrigensia
Durvilleoceras

Dy
Dyscheiloceras

Dz
Dzhaprakoceras
Dzhulfoceras

E

Eboraciceras
Eboroceras
Ebrayiceras
Echioceratoides
Echioceras
Ectocentrites
Ectolcites
Edmundites
Egrabensiceras
Eleganticeras
Elephantoceras
Ellipsoceras
Elobiceras
Emaciaticeras
Emileia
Emilites
Emperoceras
Enayites
Engonoceras
Enosphinctes
Entogonites
Eoacrochordiceras
Eoaraxoceras
Eoasianites
Eobeloceras
Eocanites
Eocephalites
Eochetoceras
Eocrioceratites
Eodanubites
Eoderoceras
Eodesmoceras
Eodouvilleiceras
Eogaudryceras
Eogonioloboceras
Eogunnarites
Eogymnites
Eohecticoceras
Eoheteroceras
Eohyattoceras

Eomadrasites
Eonomismoceras
Eopachydiscus
Eoparalegoceras
Eophyllites
Eoprodromites
Eoprotrachyceras
Eopsiloceras
Eosagenites
Eoscaphites
Eoschistoceras
Eosturia
Eotetragonites
Eothalassoceras
Eothinites
Eotissotia
Eowellerites
Epacrochordiceras
Epadrianites
Epancyloceras
Eparietites
Epaspidoceras
Epicanites
Epiceltites 
Epiceltitoides
Epicephalites
Epiceratites
Epicheloniceras
Epicosmoceras
Epideroceras
Epiglyphioceras
Epiglyptoxoceras
Epigonites
Epigymnites
Epihoplites
Epijuresanites
Epileymeriella
Epimayaites
Epimorphoceras
Epipallasiceras
Epipeltoceras
Episageceras
Episculites
Epistrenoceras
Epitauroceras
Epithalassoceras
Epitornoceras
Epivirgatites
Epiwocklumeria
Epophioceras

Erbenoceras
Eremites
Erinoceras
Erioliceras
Eristavites
Ermoceras
Erycites
Erymnoceras
Erymnocerites
Esericeras
Euagassiceras
Euaptetoceras
Euaspidoceras
Eubaculites
Eubostrychoceras
Eubranoceras
Eucalycoceras
Eucoroniceras
Eucycloceras
Eudiscoceras
Eudmetoceras
Euflemingites
Euhoplites
Euhoploceras
Euhystrichoceras
Euisculites
Eulophoceras
Eulytoceras
Eumedlicottia
Eumorphoceras
Euomphaloceras
Eupachydiscus
Euphylloceras
Eupinacoceras
Eupleuroceras
Euprionoceras
Euptychoceras
Eurites
Euroceras
Eurycephalites
Eurynoticeras
Eusagenites
Eutomoceras
Euturrilites
Exiteloceras
Exotornoceras
Ezilloella

F

Fagesia
Falciclymenia
Falciferella
Falcitornoceras
Fallacites
Falloticeras
Fanninoceras
Farbesiceras
Farnhamia
Fascipericyclus
Favrella
Fayettevillea
Fehlmannites

Ferganoceras
Ficheuria
Fikaites
Finiclymenia
Fissilobiceras
Flabellisphinctes
Flemingites
Flexiclymenia
Flexispinites
Flexoptychites
Flickia
Fontanelliceras
Fontannesia

Fontannesiella
Foordites
Forbesiceras
Forresteria
Fournierella
Frankites
Frechiella
Frechites
Frenguelliceras
Fresvillia
Frogdenites
Fuciniceras
Funiferites

G

Gabbioceras
Gabillytes
Gaetanoceras
Gagaticeras
Gaitherites
Galaticeras
Galbanites
Gangadharites
Garantiana
Gargasiceras
Garniericeras
Garnierisphinctes
Garroniceras
Gastrioceras
Gastroplites
Gattendorfia
Gattenpleura
Gaudryceras
Gaurites
Gauthiericeras
Gazdaganites
Gemmellaroceras
Gentoniceras
Genuclymenia
Georgioceras
Germariceras
Gevanites
Geyeroceras
Giovaraites
Girtyoceras

Glabrophysodoceras
Glamocites
Glaphyrites
Glassoceras
Glatziella
Glaucolithites
Gleboceras
Gleviceras
Glochiceras
Glottoptychinites
Glyphidites
Glyphiolobus
Glyptarpites
Glyptoceras
Glyptoxoceras
Gnomohalorites
Gogoceras
Goliathiceras
Goliathites
Goniatites
Gonioclymenia
Goniocyclus
Gonioglyphioceras
Gonioloboceras
Gonioloboceratoides
Gonionotites
Gonolkites
Goodhallites
Gracilisphinctes

Gracilites
Grambergia
Grammoceras
Grandidiericeras
Graphoceras
Gravesia
Grayiceras
Graysonites
Gregoryceras
Griesbachites
Groebericeras
Groenlandites
Grossouvria
Grossouvrites
Guembelites
Guhsania
Guleilmites
Guleimiceras
Gulielmina
Gulielmites
Gunnarites
Gyaloceras
Gymnites
Gymnodiscoceras
Gymnoplites
Gymnotoceras
Gymnotropites
Gyroceratites
Gyroclymenia
Gyronites

H

Ha
Haidingerites
Halilucites
Halorites
Hamites
Hamiticeras
Hamitoides
Hammatoceras
Hammatocyclus
Hamulina
Hamulinites
Hanielites
Hannaoceras
Hantkeniceras
Haploceras
Haplophylloceras
Haplopleuroceras
Haploscaphites
Haresiceras
Harpoceras
Harpoceratoides
Harpohildoceras
Harpophylloceras
Hatchericeras
Hauericeras
Hauerites
Haugia

He
Hebetoxyites
Hecticoceras
Hectioceras
Hectioceratoides
Hectoroceras
Hedenstroemia
Heinzia
Helicancylus
Helicocyclus
Helictites
Hemiaspenites
Hemibaculites
Hemigarantia
Hemihaploceras
Hemihoplites

He (Cont.)
Hemilecanites
Hemilytoceras
Hemiptychoceras
Hemisimoceras
Hemitetragonites
Hemitissotia
Hengestites
Heraclites
Herrickiceras
Hertleinites
Herznachites
Heteroceras
Heterotissotia
Hexaclymenia

Hi
Hibernicoceras
Hildaites
Hildoceras
Hildoceratoides
Hildoglochiceras
Himalayites
Himantoceras
Himavatites
Himispiticeras

Hl
Hlawiceras

Ho
Hodsonites
Hoeninghausia
Hoepenites
Hoffmannia
Holcodiscoides
Holcodiscus
Holcolissoceras
Holcophylloceras
Holcolytoceras
Holcoptychites
Hollandites
Holzapfeloceras
Holzbergia

Ho (Cont.)
Homerites
Homoceras
Homoceratoides
Homoeoplanulites
Hoplikosmokas
Hoplites
Hoplitoides
Hoplitoplacenticeras
Hoplocardioceras
Hoplocrioceras
Hoploscaphites
Hoplotropites
Horioceras
Hourcquia

Hu
Hubertoceras
Hudlestonia
Hudsonoceras
Huishuites
Hulenites
Hunanites
Hungarites

Hy
Hyattites
Hyattoceras
Hybonoticeras
Hypacanthoplites
Hyparpadites
Hypengonoceras
Hyperderoceras
Hypergoniatites
Hyperlioceras
Hyphantoceras
Hyphoplites
Hypisculites
Hypocladiscites
Hypophylloceras
Hypoturrilites
Hypoxynoticeras
Hyrcanites
Hysteroceras

I

Iberites
Idanoceras
Idiocycloceras
Idiohamites
Idoceras
Ilowaiskya
Imitoceras
Imlayiceras
Inaigymnites
Indigirites
Indigirophyllites
Indoceltites

Indocephalites
Indoceras
Indojuvavites
Indonesites
Indoscaphites
Indosphinctes
Iniskinites
Intoceras
Intornites
Intranodites
Involuticeras
Inyoites

Inzeroceras
Iranoceras
Irinoceras
Isculites
Isculitoides
Ismidites
Isohomoceras
Isohoplites
Isterites
Istreites
Ivoites

J

Jacobites
Janenschites
Japonites
Jauberticeras
Jeanneticeras
Jeanvogericeras
Jeletzkytes

Jellinekites
Jimboiceras
Jimenites
Joannites
Jouaniceras
Jovites

Juddiceras
Judicarites
Juraphyllites
Juresanites
Juvavites
Juvenites

K

Kabylites
Kachpurites
Kalloclymenia
Kamerunoceras
Kammerkaroceras
Kamptoclymenia
Kamptokephalites
Karaclymenia
Karagandoceras
Karamaiceras
Karamaites
Karangatites
Karapadites 
Karaschiceras
Kardailites
Karlwaageites
Karsteniceras
Kashmirites
Katacanites
Katroliceras
Katrolites
Kayutoceras
Kazakhoceras
Kazakhoclymenia
Kazakhstania

Kazakhstanites
Kazanskyella
Kellawaysites
Kellnerites
Kelteroceras
Kenseyoceras
Kepplerites
Keppleritiana
Kerberites
Keyserlingites
Kheraiceras
Kheraites
Khvalynites
Kiaclymenia
Kielcensia
Kilianella
Kimoceras
Kingites
Kingoceras
Kinkeliniceras
Kiparisovia
Kiparisovites
Kirsoceras
Kitchinites
Klamathites

Klematosphinctes
Klipsteinia
Knemiceras
Koenenites
Kohaticeras
Koloceras
Komioceras
Koninckites
Korythoceras
Kosmermoceras
Kosmoceras
Kosmoclymenia
Kossmatella
Kossmatia
Kossmaticeras
Kourazoceras
Kozhimites
Krafftoceras
Kranaosphinctes
Krumbeckia
Kufengoceras
Kumatostephanus
Kurnubiella
Kushanites
Kutatissites

L

Labeceras
Laboceras
Labyrinthoceras
Laganoclymenia
Lagowites
Lamberticeras
Lamites
Lanceolites
Lanceoloboceras
Laqueoceras
Latanarcestes
Latisageceras
Laugeites
Lecanites
Lechites
Lecointriceras
Leconteiceras
Leconteites
Leeites
Lehmaniceras
Leioceras
Leiophyllites
Leislingites
Lemuroceras
Lenotropites
Lenticeras
Lenticoceltites
Leopolda
Leptaleoceras
Leptechioceras

Lepthoplites
Leptoceras
Leptonotoceras
Leptosphinctes
Leptotetragonites
Leukadiella
Lewesiceras
Lewyites
Leymeriella
Liardites
Liautaudia
Libycoceras
Lilloetia
Limaites
Linguaclymenia
Linguatornoceras
Lingyunites
Lioceratoides
Liosphinctes
Liparoceras
Lipuites
Lissoceras
Lissoceratoides
Lissoclymenia
Lissonia
Lissonites
Lithacoceras
Lithacosphinctes
Lithancylus

Lobites
Lobobactrites
Lobokosmokeras
Lobolytoceras
Lobosphinctes
Lobotornoceras
Loczyceras
Lomonossovella
Longaeviceras
Longobardites
Longobarditoides
Lopholobites
Lorioloceras
Lotzeites
Ludwigia
Lunuloceras
Lupherites
Luppovella
Lusitanites
Lycetticeras
Lyelliceras
Lyrogoniatites
Lytheoceras
Lyticoceras
Lytoceras
Lytocrioceras
Lytodiscoides
Lytogyroceras
Lytohoplites

M

Ma
Macrocephalites
Macroscaphites
Madagascarites 
Maenioceras
Magharina
Malayites
Malladaites
Malletophychites
Maltoniceras
Mammites
Manambolites
Mancosiceras
Mangeroceras
Manoloviceras
Mantelliceras
Manticoceras
Manuaniceras
Maorites
Mapesites
Marathonites
Margaritropites
Marianoceras
Mariella
Marshallites
Martelites
Martolites
Masiaposites
Masonites
Maternoceras
Mathoceras
Mathoceratites
Maximites
Mayaites
Mazapilites

Me
Medlicottia
Meekoceras
Megalytoceras
Megaphyllites
Megapronorites
Megasphaeroceras
Megatyloceras
Meginoceras
Melagathiceras
Melchiorites
Melonites
Melvilloceras
Menabites

Me (cont.)
Menabonites
Meneghiniceras
Menuites
Menuthiocrioceras
Mercaticeras
Merocanites
Mescalites
Mesobeloceras
Mesocladiscites
Mesoclymenia
Mesodactylites
Mesogaudryceras
Mesopuzosia
Mesosimoceras
Mesoturrilites
Metabactrites
Metacanites
Metacarnites
Metacymbites
Metadagnoceras 
Metaderoceras
Metadimorphoceras
Metadinarites
Metagravesia
Metahamites
Metahaploceras
Metahedenstroemia
Metahoplites
Metalegoceras
Metalytoceras
Metapatoceras
Metapeltoceras
Metaplacenticeras
Metapronorites
Metaptychoceras
Metarnioceras
Metasibirites
Metasigaloceras
Metassuria
Metatibetites
Metatissotia
Metengonoceras
Metinyoites
Metoicoceras
Metoxynoticeras
Metrolytoceras
Metussuria
Mexicoceras

Mi
Miccocephalites
Michalskia
Michiganites
Micracanthoceras
Microbactrites
Microbiplices
Microdactylites
Microderoceras
Micromphalites
Microtropites
Miklukhoceras
Miltites
Mimagoniatites
Mimimitoceras
Mimosphinctes
Mirilentia
Miroclymenia
Mirojuvavites
Mirosphinctes
Mitonia
Mixomanticoceras
Miyakoceras

Mo
Moffitites
Mojsisovicsites
Mojsisoviczia
Mojsvarites
Monacanthites
Mongoloceras
Monophyllites
Moremanoceras
Morphoceras
Morrisiceras
Morrowites
Mortoniceras
Moutoniceras

Mu
Mucrodactylites
Muensterites
Muensteroceras
Muniericeras

My
Myloceras

N

Na
Nairites
Nannites
Nannocardioceras
Nannolytoceras
Nannostephanus
Nannovascoceras
Nassichukites
Nathorstites
Nautellipsites

Ne
Neancyloceras
Nebraskites
Nebrodites
Negebites
Nejdia
Nelomites
Neoaganides
Neobibolites
Neocardioceras
Neochetoceras
Neocladiscites
Neoclypites
Neocolumbites
Neocomites
Neocosmoceras
Neocraspedites
Neocrimites
Neocrioceras
Neodimorphoceras
Neogastroplites
Neogauthiericeras
Neogeoceras
Neoglaphyrites
Neoglyphioceras
Neoglytoxoceras

Ne (cont.)
Neogoniatites
Neograhamites
Neoharpoceras
Neohimavatites
Neohoploceras
Neoicoceras
Neokentoceras
Neolioceratoides
Neolissoceras
Neolobites
Neomantelliceras
Neomanticoceras
Neomicroceras
Neomorphoceras
Neopericyclus
Neopharciceras
Neophlycticeras
Neophylloceras
Neopopanoceras
Neopronorites
Neoprotrachyceras
Neoptychites
Neopulchellia
Neosaynoceras
Neoselwynoceras
Neoshumardites
Neosilesites
Neosirenites
Neostlingoceras
Neotibetites
Neouddenites
Neuqueniceras
Nevadisculites
Nevadites
Nevadoceras
Nevadophyllites
Newboldiceras
Newmarracarroceras

Ni
Niceforoceras
Nicklesia
Nicomedites
Nielsenoceras
Nigericeras
Nipponites
Nitanoceras

No
Nodiocoeloceras
Nodosageceras
Nodosoclymenia
Nodosohoplites
Nodotibetites
Noetlingites
Nolaniceras
Nomismoceras
Nordiceras
Nordophiceras
Noridiscites
Norites
Normannites
Nostoceras
Nothocephalites
Nothosporadoceras
Nothostephanus
Notoceras
Nowakites

Nu
Nuculoceras
Nummoceras

O

Obrutchevites
Obtusicostites
Ochetoceras
Ochotoceras
Odontodiscoceras
Oecoptychius
Oecotraustes
Oiophyllites
Oistoceras
Okribites
Olcostephanus
Olenekoceras
Olenikites
Onitshoceras
Onychoceras
Oosterella

Ophiceras
Ophilyroceras
Oppelia
Oraniceras
Orestites
Organoceras
Orionoides
Ornatoclymenia
Orthaspidoceras
Orthildaites
Orthoceltites
Orthogarantiana
Orthosphinctes
Orulganites
Ostlingoceras
Otoceltites

Otoceras
Otohoplites
Otoites
Otoscaphites
Ovaticeras
Owenites
Owenoceras
Oxintoceras
Oxybeloceras
Oxycerites
Oxydiscites
Oxylenticeras
Oxynoticeras
Oxyparoniceras
Oxytornoceras
Oxytropidoceras

P

Pa
Pachycardioceras
Pachyceras
Pachyclymenia
Pachydesmoceras
Pachydiscoides
Pachydiscus 
Pachyerymnoceras
Pachylyroceras
Pachylytoceras
Pachypictonia
Pachysphinctes
Padagrosites
Padragosiceras
Palaeogoniatites
Palaeokazachstanites
Palaeophyllites
Palermites
Palicites
Palnerostephanus
Paltaopites
Paltechioceras
Pamphagosirenites
Paprothites
Paquiericeras
Paraacrochordiceras
Parabactrites
Parabehavites
Paraberriasella
Parabevalites
Paraboliceras
Paraboliceratoides
Paracadoceras
Paracalycoceras
Paracanthoplites
Paraceltites
Paraceratites
Paraceratitoides
Paracladiscites
Paracochloceras
Paraconlinoceras
Paracorniceras
Paracraspedites
Paracravenoceras
Paracrioceras
Paracuariceras
Paracymbites
Paradanubites
Paradasyceras
Paradicidia
Paradimeroceras
Paradimorphoceras
Paradinarites
Paradistichites
Paradolphia
Paraganides
Paragastrioceras
Paragattendorfia
Paragoceras
Paraguembelites
Paragymnites
Parahauerites
Parahildaites
Parahomoceras
Parahoplites
Parajaubertella
Parajuvavites
Parakellnerites
Paralcidia
Paralenticeras
Paralobites
Paralytoceras
Paramammites
Parammatoceras
Paranannites
Paranclyoceras
Parandiceras
Paranorites
Paranoritoides
Parapallasiceras
Parapatoceras
Parapeltoceras
Paraperrinites
Paraphyllites
Parapinacoceras
Paraplacites
Parapopanoceras
Parapronorites
Parapuzosia 
Pararasenia
Pararcestes
Pararnioceras
Parasageceras
Parasaynoceras
Paraschartymites
Paraschistoceras
Parashumardites
Parasibirites
Parasilesites
Parasolenoceras
Paraspidites
Paraspidoceras
Paraspiticeras
Parastieria
Parastrenoceras
Parasturia
Paratexanites
Parathetidites
Parathisbites
Paratibites
Paratirolites
Paratissotia
Paratorleyoceras
Paratornoceras
Paratrachyceras
Paratropites
Paraturrilites
Paravirgatites
Parawedekindia
Parawocklumeria
Parayakutoceras
Parengonoceras
Parentites
Parinodiceras
Parkinsonia
Parodiceras
Parodontoceras
Paroecotraustes
Paroniceras
Paroxynoticeras
Partschiceras
Parussuria
Paryphoceras
Pascoeites
Paskentites
Passendorferia
Patagiosites
Paulotropites
Pavlovia
Pavloviceras

Pe
Pearylandites
Pectinatites
Pedioceras
Peltoceras
Peltoceratoides
Peltolytoceras
Peltomorphites
Pennoceras
Pentagonoceras
Pericarinoceras
Pericleites
Pericyclus
Peripleurites
Perisphinctes 
Peritrochia
Pernoceras
Peroniceras
Peronoceras

Pe (cont.)
Perrinites
Perrinoceras
Pervinquieria
Petitclercia
Petranoceras
Petrolytoceras
Petteroceras
Peytonoceras

Ph
Phaneroceras
Phanerostephanus
Pharciceras
Phaularpites
Phaulostephanus
Phaulozigzag
Phillipites
Phillipsoceras
Phlycticeras
Phlycticrioceras
Phlyseogrammoceras
Phoenixites
Phormedites
Phricodoceras
Phylloceras
Phyllocladiscites
Phyllopachyceras
Phylloptychoceras
Phyllytoceras
Phymatoceras
Physematites
Physeogrammoceras
Physodoceras

Pi
Picenia
Pictetia
Pictonia
Pimelites
Pinaclymenia
Pinacoceras
Pinacoplacites
Piriclymenia

Pl
Placenticeras
Placites
Planammatoceras
Planisphinctes
Plasmatoceras
Platotropites
Platyclymenia
Platycuccoceras
Platygoniatites
Platylenticeras
Platynoticeras
Platypleuroceras
Playfordites
Plesiacanthoceras
Plesiacanthoides
Plesiohamites
Plesiospitidiscus
Plesiotissotia
Plesioturrilites
Pleuroacanthites
Pleurocephalites
Pleuroceras
Pleurodistichites
Pleurohoplites
Pleurolytoceras
Pleuronodoceras
Pleuropinacoceras
Pleurotexanites
Pleydellia
Plictetia

Po
Poculisphinctes
Poecilomorphus
Polaricyclus
Politoceras
Polonites
Polonoceras
Polymorphites
Polyplectites
Polyplectus
Polyptychites
Polyptychoceras
Polysphinctes
Pomerania
Pompeckioceras
Pompeckjites
Ponteixites
Ponticeras
Popanites
Popanoceras
Poporites
Porpoceras
Postglatziella
Posttornoceras

Pr
Praebigotites
Praedaraelites
Praeglyphioceras
Praemanambolites
Praemeroceras
Praemuniericeras
Praeparkinsonia
Praepolyplectus
Praesphaeroceras
Praestrigites
Praetollia
Pravitoceras
Preflorianites
Preflorianitoides
Prenkites
Preshumardites
Presimoceras
Pricella
Prionites
Prionoceras
Prionocycloceras
Prionocyclus
Prionodoceras
Proarcestes
Proavites
Probeloceras
Procarnites
Procerites
Procerozigzag
Procheloniceras
Prochorites
Procladiscites
Procliviceras
Procolumbites
Procraspedites
Prodactylioceras
Prodeshayesites
Prodromites
Progalbanites
Progeronia
Progonoceratites
Progonioclymenia
Prograyiceras
Proharpoceras
Prohauericeras
Prohecticoceras
Prohelicoceras
Prohungarites
Prohysteroceras
Projuvavites
Prolecanites
Proleopoldia
Proleymeriella
Prolobites
Prolyelliceras
Promantelliceras
Promicroceras
Proniceras

Pr (cont.)
Pronoetlingites
Pronorites
Propectinatites
Properisphinctes
Properrinites
Propinacoceras
Proplacenticeras
Proplanulites
Propopanoceras
Proptychites
Proptychitoides
Prorasenia
Prorsisphinctes
Prosaphites
Proshumardites
Prosiceras
Prososphinctes
Prososphinctoides
Prosphingites
Prostacheoceras
Protacanthoceras
Protacanthodiscus
Protacanthoplites
Protaconeceras
Protactoclymenia
Protanclyoceras
Protanisoceras
Protengonoceras
Protetragonites
Proteusites
Protexanites
Prothalassoceras
Protimanites
Protocanites
Protoceras
Protoecotrausites
Protogrammoceras
Protohoplites
Protophites
Protoplatytes
Protopopanoceras
Protornoceras
Protosageceras
Protothurmannia
Prototoceras
Protoxyclymenia
Protrachyceras
Protropites
Proturrilitoides
Prouddenites
Provirgatites

Ps
Pseudacompsoceras
Pseudaetomoceras
Pseudagathiceras
Pseudammatoceras
Pseudargentiniceras
Pseudarietites
Pseudarisphinctes
Pseudaspidites
Pseudaspidoceras
Pseudharpoceras
Pseudhelicoceras
Pseudhimalayites
Pseudinvoluticeras
Pseudoaganides
Pseudoaspidoceras
Pseudobactrites
Pseudobaculites
Pseudobarroisiceras
Pseudobrightia
Pseudocadoceras
Pseudocalycoceras
Pseudocardioceras
Pseudocarnites
Pseudoceltites
Pseudoclambites
Pseudoclydoniceras
Pseudoclymenia
Pseudocosmoceras
Pseudodanubites
Pseudofavrella
Pseudoflemingites
Pseudofoordites
Pseudogarantiana
Pseudogarnieria
Pseudogastrioceras
Pseudoglaphyrites
Pseudogrammoceras
Pseudogregoryceras
Pseudohalorites
Pseudohaploceras
Pseudoinvoluticeras
Pseudojacobites
Pseudokatroliceras
Pseudokossmaticeras
Pseudokymatites
Pseudoleymeriella
Pseudolillia
Pseudolioceras
Pseudolissoceras
Pseudomercaticeras
Pseudoneoptychites
Pseudonomismoceras
Pseudoosterella
Pseudoparalegoceras
Pseudopeltoceras
Pseudoperisphinctes
Pseudophyllites
Pseudoplacenticeras
Pseudopolyplectus
Pseudoppelia
Pseudoprobeloceras
Pseudopronorites
Pseudopuzosia
Pseudosageceras
Pseudosaynella
Pseudoschistoceras
Pseudoschloenbachia
Pseudosimoceras
Pseudosirenites
Pseudosonneratia
Pseudothetidites
Pseudothurmannia
Pseudotibetites
Pseudotirolites
Pseudotissotia
Pseudotoceras
Pseudotoites
Pseudotropites
Pseudovidrioceras
Pseudovirgatites
Pseudowaagenia
Pseudoxybeloceras
Pseuduptonia
Psiloceras
Psilocladiscites
Psilohamites
Psilophyllites
Psilosturia
Psilotissotia

Pt
Pterolytoceras
Pteroscaphites
Pterosirenites
Ptycharcestes
Ptychites
Ptychoceras
Ptycholytoceras
Ptychophylloceras

Pu
Puchenquia
Puebloites
Pulchellia
Putealiceras
Puzosia
Puzosigella

Q

Qiannanites
Quasicravenoceras

Quasintoceras
Quenstedtoceras

Quinnites
Quitmannites

R

Radstockiceras
Raimondiceras
Rakusites
Ramosites
Rasenia
Rasenoides
Raymondiceras
Rectoclymenia
Reesidites
Rehmannia
Reiflingites
Reineckeia
Reineckeites
Renites
Renziceras
Repossia
Reticuloceras

Retites
Reynesella
Reynesoceras
Reynesocoeloceras
Rhabdoceras
Rhacophyllites
Rhadinites
Rhaeboceras
Rhampidoceras
Rhiphaeoclymenia
Rhiphaeocyclus
Rhymmoceras
Rhytidohoplites
Riasanites
Richardsonites
Rimkinites

Ringsteadia
Roinghites
Rollerites
Rollieria
Roloboceras
Romaniceras
Romanites
Ropoloceras
Rossalites
Rotodiscoceras
Rotopericyclus
Rubroceras
Rugiferites
Rursiceras
Rusoceras
Ryugasella

S

Sa
Sageceras
Sagenites
Saghalinites
Sakhaites
Sakmarites
Salaziceras
Salfeldiella
Saltericeras
Salterites
Sandbergeroceras
Sandlingites
Sangzhites
Sanmartinoceras
Sanyangites
Sarasinella
Saxoceras
Saynella
Saynoceras

Sc
Scalarites
Scaphamites
Scaphites 
Scaphitodites
Scarburgiceras
Schaffhauseria
Schartymites
Schindewolfites
Schindewolfoceras
Schistoceras
Schistophylloceras
Schloenbachia
Schlotheimia
Schuichengoceras
Schwandorfia
Sciponoceras
Schizoclymenia
Scoticardioceras

Se
Sellaclymenia
Sellagoniatites
Sellanarcestes
Selwynoceras
Semenovites
Semiformiceras
Semiornites
Serpianites
Serramanticoceras
Seymourites

Sh
Shahrudites
Shakraceras
Shangraoceras
Shaoyangoceras
Sharpeiceras
Shasticrioceras
Shastoceras
Shengoceras
Shikhanites
Shirbuirnia
Shouchangoceras
Shumardites

Si
Siberiptychites
Sibirites
Sibyllites
Sicanites
Sicilioceras
Siculites
Siemiradzkia
Sigaloceras
Silberlingites
Silenticeras
Silesites
Silesitoides
Simaspidoceras
Simbirskites
Simichelloceras

Si (cont.)
Simmoceras
Simoceras
Simocosmoceras
Simonyceras
Simosphinctes
Simotoichites
Sindeites
Sinotites
Sinzovia
Sirenites
Sirenotrachyceras
Sivajiceras
Sizilites

Sk
Skirroceras
Skolekostephanus

Sl
Slatterites

So
Sobolewia
Sohlites
Sokolovites
Solenoceras
Solgerites
Soliclymenia
Somaliceras
Somalites
Somoholites
Sonneratia
Sonninia
Sornayceras
Sosioceras
Sowerbyceras

Sp
Spathiceras
Spathites
Speetoniceras
Sphaeroceras
Sphaerocladiscites
Sphaerocoeloceras
Sphaerodomites
Sphaeromanticoceras
Sphaeroptychius
Sphenarpites
Sphenoclymenia
Sphenodiscus
Sphingites
Spinammatoceras
Spinokosmoceras
Spinoleiophyllites
Spiroceras
Spirogmoceras
Spirolegoceras
Spiticeras
Spitidiscus
Sporadoceras

St
Stacheites
Stacheoceras
Stantonoceras
Stantonites
Staufenia
Stegoxyites
Stehnocephalites
Steinmannites
Stemmatoceras
Stenarcestes
Stenocadoceras
Stenoclymenia
Stenocyclus
Stenoglaphyrites
Stenopharciceras
Stenopopanoceras
Stenopronorites
Stephanites

St (cont.)
Stephanoceras
Stikinoceras
Stoliczkaia
Stolleites
Stomohamites
Stoppaniceras
Streblites
Strebliticeras
Strenoceras
Striatosirenites
Strigoceras
Strigogoniatites
Strungia
Sturia
Styracoceras
Styrites

Su
Subalpinites
Subarcthoplites
Subastieria
Subbarroisiceras
Subbonarellia
Subcollina
Subcolumbites
Subcraspedites
Subdichotomoceras
Subgrossouvria
Subinyoites
Subitoceras
Subkossmatia
Sublithacoceras
Sublunuloceras
Submantelliceras
Submeekoceras
Submortoniceras
Subnebrodites
Subneumayria
Subolenekites
Suboosterella
Subperrinites
Subplanites
Subprionocyclus
Subpulchellia
Subsaynella
Subshumardites
Substeueroceras
Substreblites
Subthurmannia
Subtissotia
Subvertebriceras
Subvishnuites
Sudeticeras
Sulciferites
Sulcimitoceras
Sulcoclymenia
Sulcodimorphoceras
Sulcogirtyoceras
Sulcohamites
Sulcohamitoides
Sulcohoplites
Sundaites
Sunites
Surenites
Sutneria

Sv
Svalbardiceras
Sverdrupites
Svetlanoceras

Sy
Sympolycyclus
Synartinskia
Syngastrioceras
Synpharciceras
Synuraloceras
Synwocklumeria
Syrdenites

T

Ta
Tabantalites
Taffertia
Talenticeras
Tamarites
Tapashanites
Taramelliceras
Tardeceras
Tarrantoceras
Taskanites
Tauroceras

Te
Tectiretites
Tegoceras
Teicherticeras
Telermoceras
Teloceras
Telodactylites
Telodactylus
Temnoptychites
Terektites
Teshioites
Tetragonites (syn. Epigoniceras)
Tetrahoplites
Tetrahoplitoides
Tetraspidoceras
Texanites
Texoceras

Th
Thallassoceras
Thambites
Thamboceras
Thanamites
Theganoceras
Thetidites
Thisbites
Thomasites
Thomelites
Thorsteinssonoceras
Thraxites
Thurmannia
Thurmanniceras

Ti
Tibetites
Ticinites
Tiltoniceras
Timanites

Ti (cont.)
Timanoceras
Timorites
Tirolites
Tissotia
Titanites
Tithopeltoceras

Tj
Tjururpites

Tm
Tmaegoceras
Tmaegophioceras
Tmetoceras

To
Tokurites
Tollia
Tolypeceras
Tompophiceras
Tongluceras
Tongoboroceras
Tonoceras
Torcapella
Toricellites
Torleyoceras
Tornia
Tornoceras
Tornquisites
Tornquistites
Torquatisphinctes
Tovebirkelundites
Toxamblyites
Toxolioceras
Tozerites

Tr
Trachybaculites
Trachyceras
Trachylytoceras
Trachyphyllites
Trachypleuraspidites
Trachysagenites
Trachyscaphites
Trachystenoceras
Tragodesmoceras
Tragodesmoceroides
Tragolytoceras

Tr (cont.)
Tragophylloceras
Tragorhacoceras
Transicoeloceras
Traskites
Treptocceras
Trettinoceras
Triaclymenia
Triagolytoceras
Triainoceras
Tridentites
Trigonogastrioceras
Trilobiticeras
Trimanticoceras
Trimarginia
Trimarginites
Triozites
Tritropidoceras
Trizonoceras
Trochleiceras
Trochoclymenia
Trochoceras
Trolliceras
Tropaeum
Tropiceltites
Tropidoceras
Tropigastrites
Tropigymnites
Tropites
Tropitoides
Truyolsoceras

Ts
Tsvetkovites

Tu
Tuberodiscoides
Tugurites
Tulites
Tumaroceras
Tumilites
Tunesites
Tunglanites
Turrilites
Turrilitoides

Ty
Tympanoceras
Tyrannites

U

Uchtites
Uddenites
Uddenoceras
Ugamites
Uhligella
Uhligia
Uhligites

Umbetoceras
Umiaites
Unipeltoceras
Unquatornoceras
Uptonia
Urakawites

Uraloceras
Uraloclymenia
Uralopronorites
Ussuria
Ussurites
Utaturiceras

V

Vacekia
Valanginites
Valdedorsella
Valentolytoceras
Vallites
Vandaites
Vascoceras
Vavilovites
Velebites
Veleziceras
Venezoliceras

Verancoceras
Vermiceras
Vermisphinctes
Verneuilites
Vertebriceras
Vertebrites
Veveysiceras
Vicininodiceras
Vickohlerites
Vidrioceras
Villania

Vinalesites
Vinalesphinctes
Virgataxioceras
Virgatites
Virgatopavlovia
Virgatosimoceras
Virgatosphinctes
Virgatospinctoides
Vishnuites
Voehringerites
Vredenburgites

W

Waagenina
Waagenoceras
Waehneroceras
Wagnericeras
Waldthausenites
Wangoceras
Wasatchites
Watinoceras
Wedekindella
Wellerites
Wellsites

Welterites
Werneroceras
Wewokites
Wheatleyites
Whitbyiceras
Wichmanniceras
Wiedeyoceras
Winchelloceras
Windhauseniceras
Winslowoceras

Wintonia
Witchellia
Wocklumeria
Wopfingites
Wordieoceras
Worthoceras
Wrightoceras
Wyomingites

X

Xenoceltites
Xenocephalites

Xenodiscus
Xenodrepanites

Xipheroceras
Xiphogymnites

Y

Yabeiceras
Yakounia
Yakutoceras
Yakutoglaphyrites

Yangites
Yezoites
Yinoceras
Yokoyamaceras

Z

Zadelsdorfia
Zaraiskites
Zealandites
Zemistephanus
Zenoites
Zenostephanus
Zephyroceras
Zetoceras

Zigzagiceras
Ziyunites
Zonovia
Zuercherella
Zugodactylites

Zugokosmoceras
Zuluiceras
Zuluscaphites
Zurcherella
Zurcheria

See also 

List of nautiloids
List of heteromorphic ammonites
List of belemnites

References 

Uncited genera names can be verified at:

Sepkoski, J.J. Jr. 2002. A compendium of fossil marine animal genera. Bulletins of American Paleontology 363: 1–560. Sepkoski's Online Genus Database

External links 
 Mikko's Phylogeny Archive entry on "†Ammonoidea"
 The Paleobiology Database entry on "Ammonoidea"
 Sepkoski's Online Genus Database entry on "Cephalopoda"

 
Lists of prehistoric molluscs
Lists of animal genera (alphabetic)